Coțofănești is a commune in Bacău County, Western Moldavia, Romania. It is composed of five villages: Bâlca, Boiștea de Jos, Borșani, Coțofănești and Tămășoaia.

References

Communes in Bacău County
Localities in Western Moldavia